The One Game is a four-part 1988 British  television drama serial, produced by Central Independent Television and broadcast on ITV from 4 June to 25 June 1988.  Set and filmed in Birmingham, it starred Patrick Malahide, Stephen Dillane (credited as "Stephen Dillon"), Pippa Haywood and Kate McKenzie, and was written by John Brown from a concept by Tony Benet.

Plot 
Nick Thorne (Dillane) is a businessman who has achieved success by marketing games.  He finds himself drawn into a "reality game" by his former business partner Magnus (Malahide), whom Nick had forced out of their games company after its initial success.  Called "The One Game", this sees Nick take on a series of challenges which force him to explore his past, while both his professional and personal life come under threat.

Production 
Filming took place in the winter of 1987–8.  The production aimed at a surreal rather than a fantasy atmosphere, with an emphasis of only including narrative elements which could occur in real life. Writer John Brown worked an Arthurian theme into his scripts, with the idea that the story was about what would happen if "Arthur said to Merlin after he'd helped set up the Kingdom, 'Get lost. I don't need you any more.'"with Nick and Magnus as Arthur and Merlin, respectively; images such as a knife thrown into water, and a woman's hand rising from a lake, were likewise based on the legend of Excalibur. The theme song, "Saylon Dola", and other incidental music by series composer Nigel Hess built on the use of Celtic mythology by incorporating Welsh-sounding gibberish.

Releases 
The One Game was released on Region 2 DVD in 2003, in a set which includes a 12-page booklet detailing the series production. The One Game was re-released by Network DVD in 2016.

References

External links 
 
 The One Game (2003 release) on Amazon
 The One Game (new release) on Amazon

1980s British drama television series
1988 British television series debuts
1988 British television series endings
1980s British television miniseries
ITV television dramas
Television series by ITV Studios
Television shows produced by Central Independent Television
English-language television shows